Purple is the tenth studio album by Japanese singer Shizuka Kudo. It was released on August 2, 1995, through Pony Canyon. The album is named after Kudo's favorite color, purple, or more specifically wisteria. The record features the song "Olivia", which Kudo wrote about her deceased brother.

Critical reception
Kudo was praised for the "chic" and "mature" musical direction of the album. She was acclaimed for producing a cohesive sound, consisting of strings-intensive ballads and downtempo tracks.

Commercial performance
Purple debuted at number seven on the Oricon Albums Chart, with 55,000 units sold in its first week, marking Kudo's last studio album to debut in the top ten. The album dropped two positions to number nine on its second week, with 31,000 copies sold. It charted one last time in the top twenty, ranking at number 16 on its third week with 18,000 copies sold. Purple spent seven consecutive weeks in the top 100, selling a reported total of 140,000 copies during its run.

Track listing

Charts

References

1995 albums
Shizuka Kudo albums
Pony Canyon albums